is a 2011 Japanese film. It is based on a manga of the same name, and directed by Osamu Katayama. It debuted in Japanese cinemas on 7 May 2011.

Cast
 Shun Oguri as Sanpo Shimazaki
 Masami Nagasawa as Kumi Shiina
 Kuranosuke Sasaki as Masato Noda
 Takuya Ishida as Toshio Akutsu
 Yoshie Ichige as Ayako Tanimura
 Atsuro Watabe as Hidenori Maki
 Toshihiro Yashiba as Yohei Zama
 Kyosuke Yabe as Shunichi Ando
 Manabu Hamada as Seki
 Suzunosuke as Moriya
 Hiroyuki Onoue as a man in distress
 Kazuki Namioka as Sanpo's friend
 Ren Mori as Makoto Aoki
 Bengal as the victim's father
 Takashi Ukaji as Shuji Yokoi
 Kaito Kobayashi as Naota Yokoi
 Ken Mitsuishi as Ichiro Kaji
 Noriko Nakagoshi as Yoko Kaji
 Ken Ishiguro as Kyozo Shiina

Reception

Box office
This film was the highest-grossing film on its debut weekend of May 7–8, grossing a total of US$3,258,511.

References

External links
  
 

2011 films
Live-action films based on manga
2010s Japanese films

ja:岳 みんなの山#映画『岳-ガク-』